Me Estoy Enamorando may refer to:
Me Estoy Enamorando (album), 1997 album by Alejandro Fernández
"Me Estoy Enamorando", 1992 song by Jerry Rivera from the album Cuenta Conmigo
"Me Estoy Enamorando", 1995 song by Paulina Rubio from the album El tiempo es oro
"Me Estoy Enamorando", 1992 song by La Mafia from the album Ahora y Siempre

See also
"Me Voy Enamorando", 2015 song by Chino y Nacho